The Tugnui Coal Mine is a coal mine located in Buryatia. The mine has coal reserves amounting to 301 million tonnes of coking coal, one of the largest coal reserves in Russia and the world and has an annual production of 5.8 million tonnes of coal.

See also 
 List of mines in Russia

References 

Coal mines in Russia